Friends Can Be Lovers is the twenty-ninth studio album by American singer Dionne Warwick. Her tenth album for Arista Records, it was released on January 20, 1993 in the United States. Warwick garthered material from songwriters and producers such as Barry J. Eastmond, Harvey Mason, Siedah Garrett, Dianne Warren, and Blue Zone lead singer Lisa Stansfield. The album, which Warwick described as "a labor love" and true "family affair," also saw her collaborating with her son David Elliot and cousin Whitney Houston for the first time as well as reuniting with former contributors Burt Bacharach and Hal David on the song "Sunny Weather Love" after more than two decades.

The album was released to positive reception from music critics, some of which were her new Bacharach–David record but applauded Warwick's vocals, its production and the overall direction of the album. Commercially, though, Friends Can Be Lovers was a considerable decline from her previous efforts with Arista, becoming her first album since 1977 to not chart on the US Billboard 200 and reaching number 82 on the US Top R&B/Hip-Hop Albums only. Of all three singles that were released from the album, only "Where My Lips Have Been" was able to chart, peaking at number 95 on the Hot R&B/Hip-Hop Songs. Disappointed by its performance, Warwick later expressed her dislike of the album itself.

Background
In 1990, Warwick released Dionne Warwick Sings Cole Porter, a tribute album consisting of standards by American songwriter Cole Porter. For her next project, her tenth regular album for Arista Records, Warwick stuck to her regular formula of changing most collaborators from album to album. In hopes of providing current material without changing Warwick's trademark sound, Arista Records head Clive Davis consulted Barry J. Eastmond to produce the majority of the album. With new jack swing and hip hop soul dominating the charts then, Eastmond, along with Warwick's oldest son David Elliott, envisioned to "throw a little hop hop" into what they were planning to record with the singer.

Friends Can Be Lovers marked Warwick's first collaboration with both Elliott and her cousin, singer Whitney Houston, who contributed vocals to the duet song "Love Will Find a Way." Davis also arranged for Warwick to record with English singer Lisa Stansfield, who co-wrote the album's title track along with her former band mates from Blue Zone. Warwick herself reached out to composer Burt Bacharach and his former lyricst Hal David to reunite with her on the record. Bacharach had discovered Warwick in 1961 and, along with David, penned most of her hit singles until 1972 when the duo decided that they would discontinue writing material together. "Sunny Weather Love" marked their first collaboration in twenty years. Frequent collaborator Luther Vandross served as a backing vocalist on the Sting cover "Fragile."

Critical reception

Friends Can Be Lovers was released to positive reception from music critics.
Bil Carpenter from Allmusic called Friends Can Be Lovers "certainly one of her best-produced, best-sung and well-packaged albums since joining the Arista roster." He found that "Here lies the pleasant balance between Dionnesque pop anthems ("Age of Miracles" and "I Sing at Dawn"), ballads (Sting's "Fragile" and a duet with Whitney Houston on "Love Will Find a Way"), down-right funk on "Much Too Much" and shameless lust on "Where My Lips Have Been"." Janine McAdams from Billboard remarked that fans of the singer may find the album "a pleasant surprise" and complimented Warwick for her selection of collaborators on it, writing: "Warwick has found the right package of contemporary songs to set off her throaty purr."

Her colleague, Billboard writer Paul Verna, named Friends Can Be Lovers "a sterling set of R&B-spiced pop ballads" and cited single "Sunny Weather Love," Warwick's duet with Houston and Stansfied's title track as highlights on the album. He, though, found that the remainder of the album was "equally potent." Entertainment Weeklys Amy Linden was unimpressed by "Sunny Weather Love," but liked Stansfield's contributions to the album "whose sexy, grown-up grooves fit Dionne Warwick's burnt-umber pop stylings like a glove on Friends Can Be Lovers." In a positive review, The Indianapolis Star wrote that "the combination of covers and new material, with greatly varied influences, all distills into comfortable, vintage Dionne Warwick. Warwick is able particularly with the Bacharach–David revisitation to bring us music that seems instantly familiar and so easy to listen to."

Commercial performance
The album debuted and peaked at number 84 on the US Top R&B/Hip-Hop Albums in the week ending February 13, 1993. This marked Warwick's lowest peak for a regular studio album with all-original material since Love at First Sight (1977), her final album with Warner Bros. Records. Friends Can Be Lovers failed to chart elsewhere, also becoming her first album in 16 years to miss the US Billboard 200. In her 2011 autobiography My Life, As I See It, Warwick revealed that she "hated this project" and "did not feel the songs or production met the standards [she] was accustomed to." Particularly critical with the song Where My Lips Have Been, Warwick wrote that "it was a lot – not a little – outside of the messages I was known to deliver lyrically, and I think it tested me to the brink."

Track listing

Notes
  denotes associate producer
  denotes assistant producer

Personnel and credits 
Musicians

 Dionne Warwick – lead vocals, backing vocals (1, 4, 6, 7, 9, 10)
 Burt Bacharach – synthesizers (1), arrangements (1)
 Michael Boddicker – synthesizers (1)
 Barry J. Eastmond – synthesizers (1), arrangements (1, 2, 3, 7, 8), keyboards (2, 3, 8)
 Randy Kerber – keyboards (1, 9), acoustic piano (9)
 Eric Rehl – keyboards (2, 3, 8), synthesizers (2, 3, 8)
 Richard Tee – acoustic piano (2)
 Ian Devaney – keyboards (4, 6), arrangements (4, 6), guitar (6)
 Andy Morris – keyboards (4, 6), fluglehorn (4), arrangements (4, 6)
 David Elliot – multi instruments (5), strings (5), arrangements (5)
 Robert Wechsler – Synclavier programming (5)
 Kayama Griffin – keyboards (7)
 Bob James – synthesizer strings (9), string arrangements (9)
 Joe Kloess – keyboards (10), arrangements (10)
 Rob Shrock – keyboards (10), drum programming (10), arrangements (10)
 Dean Parks – guitar (1)
 Ira Siegel – guitar (2, 3)
 Paul Jackson, Jr. – guitar (5)
 Doc Powell – guitar (7)
 David Williams – guitar (9)
 Anthony Jackson – bass (1, 8)
 Will Lee – bass (2)
 Freddie Washington – bass (9)
 Harvey Mason – synth bass (9), synth drums (9), synth percussion (9), rhythm arrangements (9)
 Wade Short – bass (10)
 Sammy Merendino – drum programming (1, 2, 3)
 Ike Lee – drum programming (7)
 Buddy Williams – drums (8)
 Everette Harp – alto saxophone (3)
 Snake Davis – flute (4), saxophone (4)
 Roger Byam – soprano saxophone (8)
 Stephen Gibson – flugelhorn (4)
 Georgia Boyd – strings (4)
 Rebecca Gilliver – strings (4)
 Drusilla Harris – strings (4)
 Andrew Long – strings (4)
 Jane Nossek – strings (4)
 Simon Vance – strings (4)
 Paul Loomis – strings (5), string arrangements (5)
 Gayle Levant – harp (9)
 Susie Katayama – strings (10)
 David Foster – rhythm arrangements (9)
 Curtis King – backing vocals (1, 2)
 Yolanda Lee – backing vocals (1, 2, 3, 7, 8)
 Dolette McDonald – backing vocals (1, 2)
 Lisa Stansfield – backing vocals (4, 6)
 Whitney Houston – lead vocals (5)
 Alex Brown – backing vocals (5)
 Alfie Silas – backing vocals (5)
 Terry Steele – backing vocals (5)
 Will Downing – backing vocals (7)
 Audrey Wheeler – backing vocals (7)
 Tawatha Agee – backing vocals (9)
 Lisa Fischer – backing vocals (9)
 Brenda King – backing vocals (9)
 Darlene Love – backing vocals (9)
 Luther Vandross – backing vocals (9), vocal arrangements (9)

Production

 Clive Davis – executive producer 
 Burt Bacharach – producer (1)
 Barry J. Eastmond – producer (1, 2, 3, 7, 8)
 Ian Devaney –producer (4, 6), engineer (4, 6), mixing (4, 6)
 Andy Morris –  producer (4, 6), engineer (4, 6), mixing (4, 6)
 David Elliot – producer (5)
 Terry Steele – co-producer (5)
 Harvey Mason – producer (9)
 Dionne Warwick – producer (9)
 Masaki Kubo – producer (10)
 Joe Kloess – co-producer (10)
 Rob Shrock – co-producer (10), engineer (10)
 Tina Antoine – engineer
 David Apelt – engineer, mixing
 Ray Bardani – engineer, mixing
 Bobby Boughton – engineer, mixing
 Phil Castellano – engineer
 Milton Chan – engineer
 Todd Childress – engineer, assistant engineer, mix assistant 
 Earl Cohen – engineer
 Mick Guzauski – engineer
 Alec Head – engineer
 Goh Hotoda – mixing 
 Dave Jenkins – engineer
 Rich July – mix assistant 
 Don Mack – engineer, assistant engineer
 Bill Malina – engineer
 Mark Partis – engineer
 Barney Perkins – engineer
 Michael Rodriguez – engineer, assistant engineer
 Mike Ross – engineer
 Bill Schnee – mixing 
 Scott Weatherspoon – engineer
 Maude Gilman – art direction, design 
 Dave Vance – photography

Charts

References

External links
Friends Can Be Lovers at Discogs

Dionne Warwick albums
1993 albums
Albums produced by Clive Davis
Albums produced by Burt Bacharach
Arista Records albums